Howard Steel (14 May 1911 – 12 February 1987) was a former Australian rules footballer who played with Melbourne in the Victorian Football League (VFL).

Notes

External links 

1911 births
Australian rules footballers from Victoria (Australia)
Melbourne Football Club players
Brunswick Football Club players
1987 deaths